Chumi Gyatse Falls, called Domtsang and Dongzhang waterfalls in Tibetan and Chinese languages respectively, are a collection of waterfalls in the Tawang district in Arunachal Pradesh, India, close to the border with the Tibet region of China. According to the local Buddhist tradition, the 108 holly water falls which originate from in-between the mountains symbolise the blessings of Guru Padmasambhava. The Chumi Gyatse Falls are close to the Line of Actual Control, the de facto border between China and India, just 250 metres away according to one account.

Geography 

The Chumi Gyatse Falls are in an area called Yangtse where the Tsona Chu river flows from Tibet into India's Tawang district. They are along the cliff face of a high plateau ("Yangtse plateau") formed by an east–west mountain range, whose watershed serves as the India–China border as per the McMahon Line.

A few hundred meters to the north, lies Domtsang or Dongzhang, a Buddhist meditation site associated with Guru Padmasambhava.  Domtsang was evidently an important locale during the historical period so as to lend its name to the river and valley below it, as "Domtsangrong". China continues to use the names "Dongzhang river" and "Dongzhang waterfalls".

To the south of the waterfalls, Tsona Chu is joined by another river called Nyukcharong which rises from within the Yangtse plateau. A village called Tsechu lies near the confluence of the two rivers, marking the terminus of the Yangtse region.

Buddhist Legends

Domtsang 
The earliest mention of the place is in Padma bka’ thang, a fourteenth century mythography of Padmasambhava by Orgyen Lingpa; Padmasambhava stayed in Domtsang for five days, and it was one of the seven regions in Mon to have been blessed by him. Since then, Domtsang has been associated with meditation in a spectrum of Buddhist literature.

Both  [1476] and  [1564] records Düsum Khyenpa, the first Karmapa Lama (1110–1193) to have meditated at Domtsang. 's early-16th-century biography of Tsangnyön Heruka (1452–1507) notes him to have received a vision of Cakrasaṃvara upon being chased by a phantom boar during meditation in Domtsang. One of Heruka's disciples, spent time at Domtsang while practicing tummo. In late 16th c., Don Grub, the King (?) of Mon, invested himself as the patron of the "great shrine" at Domtsang.

An undated biography of Tukse Dawa Gyaltsen [c. 17th c.] records Domtsang as one of the three most sacred sites of Shar Lawog Yulsum (eastern Tawang) which was worth a day of pilgrimage. , a biography of Merag Lama  (d. 1682) which was likely drafted in the 17th century, records one  (c. 15th c.) to have had found the Che mchog temple in Domtsang. , a 18th c. work by the 6th Dalai Lama, features Domtsang as the tactile site in a mandala of the senses.

Chumi Gyatse 
Local oral traditions ascribe the falls to have been the product of a showdown between Padmasambhava and a Lama of the Bonpa sect. The Chumi Gyatse ("Chumig" = "water holes"; "gyatse" = rosary) falls was formed when Padmasambhava flung his rosary against a rock and 108 streams gushed out. Monpas believe the water to have recuperative abilities.

History 

Prior to the birth of modern nation-states of India and China, Yangtse — like, most of Tawang — remained under the suzerainty of Tibet. In February 1951, India wrested control of Tawang in a peaceful transfer of power. When the Chinese People's Liberation Army (PLA) invaded Tibet during the same year, it is believed to have destroyed the temple at Domtsang.

The region remained demilitarized until 1986 when Indian Army occupied the territory around the falls as a buffer zone in retaliation to the Chinese occupation of the Wangdung (Sumdorong Chu) pasture. In 1995, a Joint Working Group of the two countries listed both Sumdorong Chu and Yangtse among the unresolved border disputes. In 1999, the Chinese troops attempted to assert "sovereignty" over a pasture called "Dogoer" atop the waterfalls, having organised a grazing team jointly with local shepherds. Indian troops are said to have blocked their entry and a tense face-off ensued, lasting 82 days. Chinese media reports further allege India to have demolished a wooden bridge in 2001, that was used by Tibetans to access the Falls, and even setting up a sentry post to block their entry.

Beginning 2018, the state of Arunachal Pradesh has been developing the Falls as a tourism site. New roads were constructed to ease travelling from the town of Tawang. In July 2020, a gompa with a statue of Guru Padmasambhava was inaugurated. India is said to have proposed to China to allow Tibetan pilgrims to visit the Falls, but China has not chosen to do so.

See also 
 Bum La Pass
 2022 Yangste clash
 Tsona County (Cona County)

Notes

References

Bibliography 
 

Waterfalls of Arunachal Pradesh
Environment of Arunachal Pradesh
Tawang district
Waterfalls of India